Henriette Melitta Otto-Alvsleben, also Melita Alvsleben, (16 December 1842 – 13 January 1893) was a German operatic soprano and voice teacher.

Life 
Born in Dresden, Otto-Alvsleben began a three-year apprenticeship (1856 to the end of March 1860) at the age of 14, first as a pianist, then as a singer at the Dresden conservatory with Thiele. 

After graduating, she made her debut on 29 March 1860, at first against the resistance of the general director of the opera , who considered her unsuitable and initially refused her ten auditions. Nevertheless, her patron Julius Pabst succeeded in getting her into an audition, whereupon she was employed by Lüttichau for 400 thaler per year.

She remained in Dresden as lyric and coloratura soprano until 1873 engagiert at the Königliches Hoftheater Dresden. Her annual salary quickly rose to 600, 1200 and 1800 thalers. 

In 1866, she married Max Otto, who later became a senior customs officer.

Alvsleben took part in the world premiere of the opera Der Haideschacht by Franz von Holstein in Dresden on 24 October 1868. As a concert singer, she gave, for example, the soprano solo in the 9th Symphony at the Centenary Celebration 1871 in Bonn, postponed for a year because of the Franco-Prussian War.

She made her foreign debut in London in 1873, accompanying the pianist Clara Schumann in a concert at St James's Hall. Due to the great success of Bach's St Matthew Passion in Manchester that same year, she was one of the most sought-after oratorio soloists in England and Scotland for the next two years. She gave notable concerts at the Royal Albert Hall as well as the Crystal Palace in London, and at the 1874 Leeds Festival.

In 1875, Otto-Alvsleben was appointed prima donna at the Hamburg State Opera. In 1877, she returned to the Dresden Court Opera, where she worked until her stage retirement in 1883 ("Friedrichstädter Nachtigall"). On the occasion of her retirement, she was made an honorary member of the Dresden Opera House. (according to the Stadtlexikon, this is said to have taken place as early as 1879, according to Kohut).

In 1879, Otto-Alvsleben performed at the Cincinnati Music Festival.

After her retirement, she worked only as a concert and oratorio singer and as a singing teacher.

After her death,  near her flat was named after her. This was a tribute by the Verschönerungsverein für die Lößnitz (Beautification Association for the Lößnitz), as she had helped it to generate financial income for its charitable activities by participating in numerous benefit concerts.

Roles (selection) 
 Anna in Hans Heiling by Heinrich Marschner
 Rowena in Der Templer und die Jüdin by Heinrich Marschner
 Queen of the night in the Magic Flute by Mozart
 Martha in Martha by Friedrich von Flotow
 Alice in Robert le diable by Giacomo Meyerbeer
 Eva in Die Meistersinger von Nürnberg by Richard Wagner

Further reading 
 Adolph Kohut: Das Dresdner Hoftheater in der Gegenwart. E. Pierson’s Verlag. Dresden & Leipzig 1888, S. 251 f., (Numerized).
 Ludwig Eisenberg: Großes biographisches Lexikon der Deutschen Bühne im XIX. Jahrhundert. Paul List publisher, Leipzig 1903,.
 Frank Andert (Red.): ''. Historisches Handbuch für die Lößnitz. Published by Stadtarchiv Radebeul. 2nd, slightly amended edition. Stadtarchiv, Radebeul 2006, .

References

External links 
 

 Otto-Alvsleben Melitta on operissimo

German operatic sopranos
Voice teachers
1842 births
1893 deaths
Musicians from Dresden